John Riber is an Indian-born Zimbabwean filmmaker and producer. He is best known for directing the 2000 Zimbabwean comedy drama Yellow Card.

Career
He was born and raised in India. In 1977, he completed university film studies in the United States. John along with his wife Louise Riber started making films in the development arena since 1979, particularly in Bangladesh and in India. Then in 1987, they moved to Zimbabwe and established Media for Development Trust (MFD), one of Africa's leading production and distribution houses. The first film directed by John and Louise after moving to Zimbabwe is Consequences. The film won numerous festival awards and became a commercial hit. In 2000, he directed the comedy drama film Yellow Card starring Leroy Gopal and Kasamba Mkumba. The film received mixed reviews from critics and later screened at several film festivals such as Carthage Film Festival, Zanzibar International Film Festival, Southern African Film Festival in October and at Panafrican Film and Television Festival of Ouagadougou (Fespaco).

With that success, the duo made many popular Zimbabwean feature films such as Neria, More Time and Everyone's Child. The theme of most of the films and soap operas are based on reproductive health issues in Africa.

Filmography

References

External links
 

Living people
Zimbabwean film directors
Indian film directors
Year of birth missing (living people)